Thimmasamudram may refer to any of the following places in Andhra Pradesh, India.

 Thimmasamudram, Kadapa
 Thimmasamudram, Prakasam